The Turing test is a test of a machine's ability to exhibit intelligent behaviour by Alan Turing.

The Turing Test may also refer to:

 The Turing Test (novel), a 2000 Doctor Who novel featuring Alan Turing as a character
 The Turing Test (video game), a 2016 video game
 The Turing Test, a chamber opera composed by Julian Wagstaff in 2007